Alberto Benito may refer to:
Alberto Benito (footballer, born 1972), Spanish retired footballer
Alberto Benito (footballer, born 1992), Spanish footballer